The Deschutes National Forest is a United States National Forest located in parts of Deschutes, Klamath, Lake, and Jefferson counties in central Oregon.  It comprises  along the east side of the Cascade Range.  In 1908, the Deschutes National Forest was established from parts of the Blue Mountains, Cascade, and Fremont National Forests.
In 1911, parts of the Deschutes National Forest were split off to form the Ochoco and Paulina National Forests, and parts of the Cascade and Oregon National Forests were added to the Deschutes. In 1915, the lands of the Paulina National Forest were rejoined to the Deschutes National Forest. Within the boundaries of the Deschutes National Forest is the Newberry National Volcanic Monument, containing cinder cones, lava flows, and lava tubes. The Deschutes National Forest as a whole contains in excess of 250 known caves. 
The forest also contains five wilderness areas, six National Wild and Scenic Rivers, the Oregon Cascade Recreation Area, and the Metolius Conservation Area. Forest headquarters are located in Bend, Oregon. There are local ranger district offices in Bend, Crescent, and Sisters.

Recreational activities in Deschutes National Forest include boating, fishing, wildlife watching, and hiking, as well as mountain biking on an extensive system of trails.  Hiking and skiing can be done on Mount Bachelor, a stratovolcano in the Cascade Range.

Wilderness areas
There are five officially designated wilderness areas within Deschutes National Forest that are part of the National Wilderness Preservation System. All of them are shared administratively with neighboring National Forests (as indicated).
 Diamond Peak Wilderness (partly in Willamette NF)
 Mount Jefferson Wilderness (mostly in Willamette NF; partly in Mount Hood NF)
 Mount Thielsen Wilderness (mostly in Winema NF (46.99%) or in Umpqua NF (40.36%)
 Mount Washington Wilderness (mostly in Willamette NF)
 Three Sisters Wilderness (mostly in Willamette NF)

See also
Deschutes River (Oregon)
Cascade Lakes Scenic Byway

References

External links

The National Forest Foundation's Conservation Plan for the Deschutes National Forest
Deschutes National Forest from the U.S. Forest Service.

 
National Forests of Oregon
Protected areas of Deschutes County, Oregon
Protected areas of Klamath County, Oregon
Protected areas of Lake County, Oregon
Protected areas of Jefferson County, Oregon
1908 establishments in Oregon
Protected areas established in 1908